In organic chemistry, a ketene is an organic compound of the form , where R and R' are two arbitrary monovalent chemical groups (or two separate substitution sites in the same molecule). The name may also refer to the specific compound ethenone , the simplest ketene.

Although they are highly useful, most ketenes are unstable.  When used as reagents in a chemical procedure, they are typically generated when needed, and consumed as soon as (or while) they are produced.

History
Ketenes were first studied as a class by Hermann Staudinger before 1905.

Ketenes were systematically investigated by Hermann Staudinger in 1905 in the form of diphenylketene (conversion of -chlorodiphenyl acetyl chloride with zinc). Staudinger was inspired by the first examples of reactive organic intermediates and stable radicals discovered by Moses Gomberg in 1900 (compounds with triphenylmethyl group).

Properties
Ketenes are highly electrophilic at the carbon atom bonded with the heteroatom, due to its sp character. Ketene can be formed with different heteroatom bonded to the sp carbon atom, such as O, S or Se, respectively named ketene, thioketene and selenoketene.

Ethenone, the simplest ketene, has different experimental lengths for each of the double bonds; the C=O bond is 1,160Å and the C=C bond is 1,314Å. The angle between the two H atoms is 121.5°, similar to the theoretically ideal angle formed in alkenes between sp2 carbon atom and H substituents. 

Ketenes are unstable and cannot be stored. In the absence of nucleophiles with which to react, ethenone dimerises to give β-lactone, a cyclic ester. If the ketene is disubstituted, the dimerisation product is a substituted cyclobutadione. For monosubstituted ketenes, the dimerisation could afford either the ester or the diketone product.

Synthesis
Ethenone can be generated by pyrolysis (thermal cracking) of acetone:
CH3−CO−CH3  → CH2=C=O + CH4
This reaction is called the Schmidlin ketene synthesis.

Other ketenes can be prepared from acyl chlorides by an elimination reaction in which HCl is lost:

In this reaction, a base, usually triethylamine, removes the acidic proton alpha to the carbonyl group, inducing the formation of the carbon-carbon double bond and the loss of a chloride ion:

Ketenes can also be formed from α-diazoketones by Wolff rearrangement.

Another way to generate ketenes is through flash vacuum thermolysis (FVT) with 2-pyridylamines. Plüg and Wentrup developed a method in 1997 that improved on FVT reactions to produce ketenes with a stable FVT that is moisture insensitive, using mild conditions (480 °C). The N-pyridylamines are prepared via a condensation with R-malonates with N-amino(pyridene) and DCC as the solvent.

A more robust method for preparing ketenes is the carbonylation of metal-carbenes, and in situ reaction of the thus produced highly reactive ketenes with suitable reagents such as imines, amines, or alcohols. This method is an efficient one‐pot tandem protocol of the carbonylation of α‐diazocarbonyl compounds and a variety of N‐tosylhydrazones catalysed by Co(II)–porphyrin metalloradicals leading to the formation of ketenes, which subsequently react with a variety of nucleophiles and imines to form esters, amides and β‐lactams. This system has a broad substrate scope and can be applied to various combinations of carbene precursors, nucleophiles and imines.

Reactions and applications
Due to their cumulated double bonds, ketenes are very reactive.

Formation of carboxylic acid esters 
By reaction with alcohols, carboxylic acid esters are formed:

Formation of carboxylic anhydrides 
Ketenes react with a carboxylic acids to form carboxylic acid anhydrides:

Formation of carboxylic acid amides 
Ketenes react with ammonia to primary amides:

The reaction of ketenes with primary amines produces secondary amides:

Ketenes react with secondary amines to give tertiary amides:

Hydrolysis 
By reaction with water, carboxylic acids are formed from ketenes

Formation of enol esters 
Enol esters are formed from ketenes with enolisable carbonyl compounds. The following example shows the reaction of ethenone with acetone to form a propen-2-yl acetate:

Dimerisation 
At room temperature, ketene quickly dimerizes to diketene, but the ketene can be recovered by heating:

[2+2]-cycloaddition 
Ketenes can react with alkenes, carbonyl compounds, carbodiimides and imines in a [2+2] cycloaddition. The example shows the synthesis of a β-lactam by the reaction of a ketene with an imine (see Staudinger synthesis):

Applications
Ketenes are generally very reactive, and participate in various cycloadditions. One important process is the dimerization to give propiolactones. A specific example is the dimerization of the ketene of stearic acid to afford alkyl ketene dimers, which are widely used in the paper industry. AKD's react with the hydroxyl groups on the cellulose via esterification reaction.

They will also undergo [2+2] cycloaddition reactions with electron-rich alkynes to form cyclobutenones, or carbonyl groups to form beta-lactones. With imines, beta-lactams are formed. This is the Staudinger synthesis, a facile route to this important class of compounds. With acetone, ketene reacts to give isopropenyl acetate.

A variety of hydroxylic compounds can add as nucleophiles, forming either enol or ester products. As examples, a water molecule easily adds to ketene to give 1,1-dihydroxyethene and acetic anhydride is produced by the reaction of acetic acid with ketene.

Ethyl acetoacetate, an important starting material in organic synthesis, can be prepared using a diketene in reaction with ethanol. They directly form ethyl acetoacetate, and the yield is high when carried out under controlled circumstances; this method is therefore used industrially.

See also 
Ynol
Thioketene

References

External links 

 
Functional groups